Manica may refer to:

 Manica Province, a province of Mozambique
 Manica, Mozambique, a town
 Manica, a part of the male Lepidoptera genitalia 
 Manica (armguard), armguards used by Roman legionaries and gladiators
 Manica (genus), a genus of ants
 HMS Manica, kite balloon ship of the British Royal Navy
 MANICA Architecture, a architecture firm

See also
Manyika tribe, of eastern Zimbabwe